Tuli may refer to:

Modern places (alphabetical by country) 
 Tülü, Balakan, Azerbaijan
 Tülü, Lerik, Azerbaijan
 Tuli (Trebinje), a settlement in the city of Trebinje, Bosnia and Herzegovina
 Tuli Block, a small region of Botswana
 Tuli, India, a town in Mokokchung District, Nagaland state, India
 Tuli headquarter, the administrative township of Tuli, Mokokchung district, Nagaland, India
 Tuli, Iran, a village in West Azerbaijan Province, Iran
 Tuli, Ardabil, a village in Ardabil Province, Iran
 Tuli Ashaqi, a village in East Azerbaijan Province, Iran
 Tuli, Zimbabwe, a village in the province of Matabeleland South, Zimbabwe

Ancient places 
 Tylis (Τύλις), sometimes transliterated into English as Túli or Túlis, a region near ancient Byzantium

Other uses 
 Tuli (cattle), a beef cattle breed that originated from Zimbabwe
 Tuli (name)
 Tuli (rite), Philippine ritual male circumcision
 Tuli clan, a caste clan in India
 Tuli River, a tributary of the Shashe River in Zimbabwe

See also
Thuli (disambiguation)
Tulli, a surname